Thomas Simaku (born 18 April 1958, in Kavajë) is an Albanian composer.

Education
Simaku studied composition between the years 1978–1982 at the Academy of Music and Arts of Albania under Tonin Harapi. After graduation he was nominated as Director of Music at the Palace of Culture of Permet, in southern Albania.

In 1991 Simaku moved to England to study for a PhD in composition with David Blake at the University of York, which he was awarded in 1996.

Prizes and awards

Notable prizes and awards that Simaku has won include:
 1993: Lionel Robbins Memorial Scholarship, being the only candidate from the UK to win that year.
 1996: Leonard Bernstein Fellowship in Composition at Tanglewood Music Centre in the U.S. with Bernard Rands.
 1998: Fellowship at the Composers' Workshop at California State University with Brian Ferneyhough.
 2000: Fellowship from the Arts & Humanities Research Council in London.
 2004: Serocki International Prize, Warsaw.
 2009: British Composer Award (Instrumental) for Soliloquy V: Flauto Acerbo.
 2013: First Prize in the International Composition Competition for Lutoslawski's 100th Birthday for Concerto for Orchestra.

Performances

Simaku's music has been performed throughout the UK and Europe, as well as in North America, Australia and the Far East. In 1995 his work Epitaph for String Orchestra was selected by the International Jury for the ISCM World Music Days in Germany - the first ever Albanian music to be included in this prestigious festival.  Subsequently, Simaku's works have been selected by the International Jury at the World Music Days of 1999, 2000, 2001, 2003, 2004, 2005, 2006, and 2012.

Other international festivals where his music has been performed include
Music Biennale Zagreb, Tanglewood, Avignon, Miami, Cagliari, KlangSpectrum (Austria), Viitasaari (Finland), Innsbruck (Austria), Odense (Denmark), Manchester, York, Birmingham, Automne de Tirana amongst others. In October 2013, Simaku was invited to give a lecture at the 5th Pharos International Contemporary Music Festival in Nicosia, Cyprus, on the genesis and processes involved in his Soliloquy Cycle.

Publication
Simaku's music is published in England by University of York Music Press and Emerson Edition. In 2008, the Kreutzer Quartet recorded a CD of string quartets and solo works by Simaku for Naxos Records.

Personal
In 2000, Simaku was granted British citizenship. He lives in York with his wife and two daughters. Simaku is a Reader in Composition at the University of York.

References

External links
 Homepage at the University of York
 Biography at the University of York Music Press

1958 births
Living people
Albanian emigrants to England
Composers from Kavajë
20th-century classical composers
Male classical composers
20th-century Albanian musicians
21st-century classical composers
20th-century British musicians
21st-century British musicians
20th-century British male musicians
21st-century British male musicians
Academics of the University of York